Edward Malvern Handy (January 15, 1904 – January 17, 1975) was an American football coach. Handy was the fifth head football coach at The Apprentice School in Newport News, Virginia and he held that position for two seasons, from 1927 until 1928. His coaching record at Apprentice was 5–9–1.

References

External links
 

1904 births
1975 deaths
The Apprentice Builders football coaches